František Čáp (7 December 1913 – 12 January 1972), also known as Franz Cap in Germany, was a Czech and later a Yugoslav film director and screenwriter. He directed 32 films between 1939 and 1970. Having created Slovene film classics such as Vesna, Ne čakaj na maj and Our Car, he is also one of the most popular directors of early Slovene cinema in 1950s and the 1960s.

Life
Čáp was born in Čachovice (now in central Czech Republic). As an already established professional, he moved to Ljubljana in 1952, following an invitation by Branimir Tuma, director of Triglav Film. In 1957, he moved to Portorož, a coastal town in southwestern Slovenia, where he lived until his death.

Work
Prior to his arrival in Yugoslavia, Čáp was praised as the young star of Czech cinema. During World War II he directed a dozen light romantic dramas and melodramas, among them the internationally acclaimed Nocturnal Butterfly which won a prize at the Venice film festival, and Men Without Wings which won a prize for Best Director in Cannes. His last Czechoslovak film The White Darkness, his personal favorite, put him in conflict with the communist authorities. After the criticism his film received by workers jury at Zlín film festival, Čáp called the jury "morons who don't understand [his] films". This didn't go well in communist Czechoslovakia and he was banned from directing movies. He fled to West Germany, where he directed three films, including All Clues Lead to Berlin which was distributed to many countries. He arrived in Yugoslavia by invitation of the director of a Slovene film production company Branimir Tuma, to help in the development of the Slovene film industry in the 1950s.

In the 1950s and 1960s Čap directed five films for Triglav film and another six co-productions and non-Slovene productions. Čáp's first Yugoslav film, romantic comedy Vesna (1953), had elements of Heimatfilm and pre-World War II Czech and Austrian melodrama, and proved highly successful both artistically and commercially, as did its sequel Ne čakaj na maj (1957). Vesna remains one of the most popular Slovene classics. It took the place of the first commercial film - and the first comedy - in Slovene cinema, and was precisely the urban, modern and technically exquisite film that Triglav film had hoped for when it employed Čap.

Čap's second Slovene film was a war drama Trenutki odločitve (Moments of Decision, 1955) about the urgency of reconciliation between partisans and white guards, a topic with which he produced the first censored film in Slovenia.

During his "Yugoslav era", Čap did not only engage in Slovene productions, but in various  other acclaimed productions and co-productions. He directed Am Anfang war es Sünde (Sin / Greh, 1954, Saphir Film) and the romantic drama La ragazza della salina (Sand, Love and Salt / Kruh in sol, 1957), which featured Marcello Mastroianni. For Bosna film, he directed a drama about juvenile delinquency Vrata ostaju otvorena (The Door Remains Open, 1959), introducing Milena Dravić, one of the leading film stars in Yugoslavia, in her very first film role, and another comedy Srešćemo se večeras (Meet You Tonight, 1962).

In 1956 Čáp shot Die Geierwally (The Vulture Wally), based on the novel by Wilhelmine von Hillern, in Germany, while X-25 javlja ("X-25 Reports", 1960), a World War II spy thriller set in Zagreb, saw extensive international theatrical release as well. However, after his poorly received comedy Naš avto (Our Car, 1962), Čáp was unable to find work in Yugoslavia and he turned to direct for television. He was engaged in directing a TV series and two TV films for German and Austrian televisions. In Slovenia where he lived, though, he was only able to participate in one more production, directing a short film Piran (1965).

Criticism and reception
Contemporary Slovene film criticism widely accepts that the 5 films that František Čap directed in Slovene, Vesna, Trenutki odločitve, Ne čakaj na maj, X 25 Reports and Our Car, introduced a Hollywood type of narrative and cosmopolitan appearance to 1950's Slovene cinema. Though struggling with negative criticism in his own time, today Čáp is praised as a craftsman who helped the undeveloped Slovene and Yugoslav cinema – at the time infected with dilettante technical standards, problematic focus on local issues and stiff literary adaptations – to rise to the level of an exquisite craft with universal intelligibility.

Some critics viewed it as "genre cinema" — as Čáp mostly directed comedies, thrillers, and melodramas — though these do not correspond strictly to genre rules. "Mainstream cinema" is a term that more accurately describes its aim to attract the audience by means of a classical, easily intelligible narrative, and by emphasizing the story and dramatic structure, not so much qualities of cinema as an art form.

The negative reviews of Čáp's work occurred mostly during the times of 1960's, 70's and 80's Yugoslavian film criticism. The orthodox communist reviewers saw in it a bourgeois threat to socialist values, and a conservative return to the middle class phantom concepts (e.g. The idea of innocent romantic love). They also minded Čáp's comedies’ prevailing themes of spoiled youth and their sexual awakening in Vesna and Ne čakaj na maj.

The name object of early criticism, however, was the misrepresentation (or lack of representation) of Slovene culture in Čáp's cinema, especially in the hugely popular comedies. A number of reviewers saw Čáp as a foreigner who has never assimilated to Slovene culture. They resented that the films were not specific enough and could be set anywhere in Central Europe. These reviews seem traditionalist and xenophobic from contemporary point of view. Contemporary Slovene film theorists have largely praised Čáp's "foreignness" or "otherness", reasoning that his ignorance for regional values and conflicts has actually helped him to maintain the necessary objective distance and his particular sense of film direction and storytelling.

Čáp and Slovene
Contrary to complaints regarding the generic nature of the films, it is well recognized that Čáp contributed drastically to the adaptation of Slovene for cinematic use. The dialogues were fluent and had substance, there was plenty of wordplays, verbal comedy, urban slang and authentic regional accents. The dialogues from Čap's comedies came into general usage and became items of universal joking across generations and nation. Whereas Slovene in pre-Čap cinema had not functioned well, Čáp invented a slang liberated from constraints of purism and theatricality. Thus the director, while being attacked for directing un-Slovene films by many reviewers, in fact enriched Slovene language and culture.

Selected filmography

 A Step into the Darkness (1937) - screenwriter only
 Virginity (1937) - screenwriter only
 Fiery Summer (1939)
 Grandmother (1940)
 Jan Cimbura (1941)
 Nocturnal Butterfly (1941)
 Mist on the Moors (1944)
 The Girl from Beskydy Mountains (1944)
 Men Without Wings (1946)
 Sign of the Anchor (1947)
 Muzikant (1948)
 The White Darkness (1948)
 Crown Jewels (1950)
 All Clues Lead to Berlin (1952)
 Vesna (1953)
 The Beginning Was Sin (Slovene: Greh) (1954)
 Moments of Decision (Slovene: Trenutki odločitve) (1955)
 The Vulture Wally (1956)
 Don't Whisper (Slovene: Ne čakaj na maj) (1957)
 Sand, Love and Salt (Slovene: Kruh in sol) (1957)
 The Door Remains Open (Bosnian: Vrata ostaju otvorena) (1957)
 X 25 Reports (Slovene: X 25 javlja) (1960)
 Meet You Tonight (Bosnian: Srešćemo se večeras) (1962)
 Our Car (Slovene: Naš avto) (1962)
 Mafia – Die ehrenwerte Gesellschaft (1966, TV miniseries)
  (1968–1969, TV series)

Awards
 Nocturnal Butterfly - Targa di segnalazione at 1941 Venice Film Festival
 Men Without Wings - Grand Prix at 1946 Cannes Film Festival
 Vesna - The Critics' Choice Award at the 1954 Pula Film Festival
 Moments of Decision - Big Golden Arena for Best Film at the 1955 Pula Film Festival

References

External links

1913 births
1972 deaths
People from Mladá Boleslav District
People from the Kingdom of Bohemia
Czech film directors
Czechoslovak film directors
Czech screenwriters
Male screenwriters
Yugoslav film directors
Yugoslav screenwriters
German-language film directors
Slovene-language film directors
LGBT film directors
Czech LGBT screenwriters
Directors of Palme d'Or winners
Golden Arena for Best Director winners
20th-century screenwriters
20th-century Czech LGBT people
Czechoslovak emigrants to Yugoslavia